Lankaran is a city in Azerbaijan, on the coast of the Caspian Sea, near the southern border with Iran. As of 2021, the city had a population of 89,300. It is next to, but independent of, Lankaran District. The city forms a distinct first-order division of Azerbaijan.

Etymology 
The old form of the name was "Langarkanan" that in Persian means "the place of pulling up the anchor(s)" : "Langar" (anchor) + "kan" (to pull) + "an"(suffix of places). However, some sources state that Lankaran is said to come from  the Talish words for 'Cane house', which sounds as 'Lan Kəon'. Alternatively, from Median *Lan(a)karan-, where *karan- means 'border, region, land' and Lan is probably a name of a Caspian tribe.

History 
The city was built on a swamp along the northern bank of the river bearing the city's name. There are remains of human settlements in the area dating back to the Neolithic period as well as ruins of fortified villages from the Bronze and Iron Ages.

With the death of Nader Shah (r. 1736–1747), the Talysh Khanate was founded by a certain Seyyed Abbas, whose ancestors were members of the Iranian Safavid dynasty, and had moved into the Talish region in the 1720s during a turbulent period in Iranian history. From the founding of the khanate until 1828, it was under the suzerainty of the Iranian Zand and Qajar dynasties. In the first half of the 18th century, the Russians gained control over it for a few years during the Russo-Persian War of 1722–1723; in 1732 it was ceded back to Iran by the Treaty of Resht. During the Russo-Persian War of 1804–1813, General Kotlyarevsky, heading the southernmost Russian contingent during the war, stormed and captured Lankaran's fortress. Following the Treaty of Gulistan of 1813, it was ceded to Russia. Qajar Iran would later retake the city during the Russo-Persian War of 1826–1828, but was forced to return it following the Treaty of Turkmenchay (1828), which saw the definite end of Persian influence in the South Caucasus.

Under Russian rule, Lankaran, known as Lenkoran in Russian, was the center of the Lenkoran Uyezd of the Baku Governorate. Following the collapse of the Russian Empire, it was a part of the short-lived Azerbaijan Democratic Republic (1918–1920), then became a part of the Azerbaijan Soviet Socialist Republic following the sovietization of Azerbaijan. In 1991, following the dissolution of the Soviet Union, it became a part of independent Azerbaijan.

Geography 
There are sandy beaches near Lankaran. Thermal sulphide, chloride, sodium-calcium waters of Andjin (Upper and Lower) mineral springs are situated 12 km west of the town. Also to the west are the ruins of Ballabur castle, near the village with the same name.

The region has a vast area of national parks, where a variety of fauna and flora are preserved. Gizil-Agach State Reserve hosts over 250 kinds of plants, 30 species of fish and more than 220 kinds of birds. Lankaran is also known for Parrotia, or ironwood. It is naturally grown in the region and could be seen in Hirkan National Park. Local myth has it that it is the only wood that sinks in water, hence the name (ironwood). Historically it has been used for heating since it burns for a long time and is not easily extinguished. The Persian leopard (Panthera pardus saxicolous) subspecies of the leopard, lives in the national park as well. In 1937, members of the Opilio lepidus species of harvestman were sighted in the area.

Climate 
Lankaran has a hot-summer Mediterranean climate (Köppen climate classification: Csa), with cool, wet winters and very warm, partially dry/highly humid summers.

Economy 
Dominating spheres in the economy of Lankaran are vegetable-growing, tea-growing, paddy cultivating, cattle-breeding, citrus plants, beekeeping, fishing, and grain farming. Favourable humid subtropical climate, availability of good arable land, water and sufficient labour resources of the city provides a good basis for agricultural activities as well as the development of agro-processing enterprises. The city is also home to Azerbaijan's first tea plant, built in 1937.

Demographics 
The vast majority of the population of Lankaran is Talysh, and the rest are Azerbaijanis and other nationalities.

Religion 
The religion with the largest community of followers is Islam. The majority of the Muslims are Shia Muslims, and the Republic of Azerbaijan has the second-highest Shia population percentage in the world after Iran. The city's notable mosques include Kichik Bazar Mosque and Boyuk Bazar Mosque.

Culture 
As of 2012, the city along with Baku and Ganja participated in Earth Hour movement.

Cuisine 
Lankaran's cuisine has largely been affected by its multicultural history, hence the large variety of food originating during Talysh Khanate. Lankaran's signature cuisine includes lavangi, Lankaran kulcha, marji plov, white plov, pumpkin plov and turshu kebab.

Music and media 

Lankaran is home to several national folk performers, including the Bacılar (The Sisters) national Talysh folk and dance collective.

The regional channel Janub TV and newspaper Lankaran are headquartered in the city.

Sports 

The city used to have a professional football team competing in the top-flight of Azerbaijani football - Khazar Lankaran, which played in the Azerbaijan Premier League. Sporting venues in the city include the Lankaran City Stadium and Lankaran Olympic Sports Complex. The stadium was one of the venues for the group stages of the 2012 FIFA U-17 Women's World Cup.

In 2012, the city won to host European Masters Weightlifting Championship.

Transport

Air 
The Lankaran International Airport's international terminal was opened in September 2008.

Railway 
The city has rail service from historic terminals in downtown to Baku in the east and Astara in the south.

Education 

The following universities are located in Lankaran:
 Lankaran State University – founded in 1991, Lankaran State University is Lankaran's first university to start courses.

Notable people 

The city's notable residents include: 
Major-General of the Soviet armoured troops during World War II 
Hazi Aslanov, General of the Artillery in the Imperial Russian Army 
Samad bey Mehmandarov, folk singer and theatre actress Jahan Talyshinskaya
Social activist Maryam Bayramalibeyova
Pop singer Ilhama Gasimova
Weightlifter Turan Mirzayev
Singer Hagigat Rzayeva
Footballer Dmitriy Kramarenko

Twin towns 
Lankaran is twinned with:
  Monterey, United States (since 2011)
  Iskenderun, Turkey 
  Cerveteri, İtalia (since 2013)

Gallery

See also 
 Lankaran Lowland

References

Sources

External links 

 Official city webpage - (English version)
 Lankaran State University
 Soviet topographic map 1:100,000 (published in 1991)
 Satellite photo via Google Maps
 History
 Economy
 

Lankaran
Port cities in Azerbaijan
Districts of Azerbaijan
Populated places on the Caspian Sea